Calandrinia galapagosa is a species of plant in the Montiacea family. It is endemic to the Galápagos Islands of Ecuador.

References

galapagosa
Endemic flora of Ecuador
Conservation dependent plants
Taxonomy articles created by Polbot